Osage Bend is an unincorporated community in Cole County, in the U.S. state of Missouri.

History
A post office called Osage Bend was established in 1908, and remained in operation until 1921. The community was named for a nearby meander on the Osage River.

References

Unincorporated communities in Cole County, Missouri
Unincorporated communities in Missouri
Jefferson City metropolitan area